Jack V. Doland (March 3, 1928 – April 25, 1991) was an American football coach, college athletics administrator, university president, and politician. He served as the head football coach at the McNeese State University from 1970 to 1978, compiling a record of 64–32–4.  Doland was the athletic director at McNeese State from 1972 to 1980 and the president of the school from 1980 to 1987.  He was elected to the Louisiana State Senate in 1987.  Doland died of prostate cancer on April 25, 1991, at the University of Texas MD Anderson Cancer Center in Houston, Texas.

Head coaching record

College

References

External links
 
 

1928 births
1991 deaths
20th-century American academics
20th-century American politicians
Heads of universities and colleges in the United States
Louisiana state senators
LSU Tigers football coaches
McNeese Cowboys and Cowgirls athletic directors
McNeese Cowboys baseball players
McNeese Cowboys football coaches
McNeese Cowboys football players
Tulane Green Wave baseball players
Tulane Green Wave football players
High school football coaches in Louisiana
Louisiana State University alumni
People from Lake Arthur, Louisiana
Players of American football from Louisiana
Baseball players from Louisiana
Deaths from prostate cancer
Deaths from cancer in Texas